Tunta Airport  is an airport serving the town of Kabinda, Lomami Province, Democratic Republic of the Congo.

See also

 Transport in the Democratic Republic of the Congo
 List of airports in the Democratic Republic of the Congo

References

External links
 FalllingRain - Tunta Airport
 HERE Maps - Tunta
 OpenStreetMap - Tunta
 OurAirports - Tunta Airport
 

Airports in Lomami